Leleuporella is a genus of beetles in the family Carabidae, containing the following species:

 Leleuporella caeca Basilewsky, 1956
 Leleuporella devagiriensis Abhitha & Sabu, 2009
 Leleuporella gabonensis Bulirsch & Magrini, 2019
 Leleuporella mandibularis (Burgeon, 1935)
 Leleuporella sexangulata Balkenohl, 1997
 Leleuporella tuberculata Fedorenko, 2012

References

Scaritinae